is a Japanese archer who represented Japan at the 1972 Summer Olympic Games in archery.

Olympics 

Akiyama competed in the women's individual event and finished seventeenth with a total of 2301 points.

References

External links 
 Profile on worldarchery.org

1949 births
Living people
Japanese female archers
Olympic archers of Japan
Archers at the 1972 Summer Olympics